Michele Buck is an American businesswoman. In March 2017, she became the first female Chairman, President, and CEO of The Hershey Company, an American food manufacturing company, replacing former CEO John Bilbrey.

Early life and education 
A native of central Pennsylvania, Buck earned a bachelor's degree at Shippensburg University of Pennsylvania and received a Master of Business Administration degree from the University of North Carolina at Chapel Hill in 1987.

Career 
Before joining Hershey in 2005, Buck worked for 17 years at Kraft/Nabisco, holding several senior positions including Senior Vice President and General Manager for Kraft Confections, as well as senior positions at the Frito-Lay division of PepsiCo.

At Hershey, Buck spearheaded the acquisition of Krave Beef Jerky, acquired by Hershey in 2015, and barkThins, a healthy chocolate brand acquired in 2016. Prior to her appointment as CEO, Buck served as Chief Operating Officer for Hershey, where she led the company's day-to-day operations in North America as well as operations in Central and South America. In December 2016, it was announced that she was to succeed John Bilbrey as chief executive officer of the company.

In 2017, Hershey announced its first acquisition under Buck, a $1.6B deal to purchase Amplify Snack Brands, further diversifying Hersey's holdings in the healthy snack category. It is the largest deal to date in the history of The Hershey Company.

Buck currently serves on the board of directors at New York Life, and as a Benefit Co-Chair for the Children's Brain Tumor Foundation.

In October 2019, Buck was elected chairman of the board of directors at The Hershey Company.

Awards 
In 2005, while serving as Senior Vice President, President of U.S. Snacks at Hershey, Buck received the Women Worth Watching Award.

Buck received a Corporate Citizenship Award from the Committee for Economic Development or CED.

Buck has been named multiple times to Fortune's "Most Powerful Women" list.

References

Year of birth missing (living people)
Living people
American chief executives of food industry companies
UNC Kenan–Flagler Business School alumni
The Hershey Company
American chief executives of Fortune 500 companies
American women chief executives
Shippensburg University of Pennsylvania alumni
21st-century American women